Fred Samara (born April 6, 1950) is an American athlete. He competed in the men's decathlon at the 1976 Summer Olympics.

References

1950 births
Living people
Athletes (track and field) at the 1976 Summer Olympics
American male decathletes
Olympic track and field athletes of the United States
Sportspeople from Brooklyn
Track and field athletes from New York City